"Pretty Handsome Awkward" is the second single from the Used's third studio album, Lies for the Liars. The song was released to US alternative radio on August 21, 2007 and released to UK radio on September 3. The song is perhaps best known for being played during a chase scene in Michael Bay's film Transformers and is also featured on the soundtrack as well as a downloadable track on Guitar Hero III: Legends of Rock. The single peaked at No. 37 on the US Alternative Airplay. It was rumored that the track was written about My Chemical Romance frontman Gerard Way, but Bert McCracken said that this is not true. In 2019, while performing at the Rockstar Disrupt Festival, Bert confirmed the song was about Way.

Track listings

CD single

DVD single

7-inch picture disc

Music video
The video starts with footage from the 2007 MuchMusic Video Awards of the band and Chadam walking down the street, with screaming fans on the sidewalks, and an interviewer asks "You guys gonna get all wasted tonight? Up to your normal antics?" Bert responds, "Nah, we're a little partied out, we'll probably try to take, take it easy and chill out afterward," after which a huge party is shown with the aforementioned antics being performed throughout. Jeph Howard also appears as a cross-dressed prostitute in the video. In one of the videos, he flashes the camera. At the end, the piece of dialogue at the beginning is repeated with this added afterward by the reporter: "What are you guys wusses or somethin'?".

Charts

References

The Used songs
2007 singles
Songs from Transformers (film series)
2007 songs
Reprise Records singles
Song recordings produced by John Feldmann
Songs written by Quinn Allman
Songs written by Jeph Howard
Songs written by Bert McCracken